Viktor Hugo Suolahti (7 October 1874 in Hämeenlinna – 23 February 1944 in Helsinki) was a Finnish politician, linguist and philologist. Before 1906, he was known as Viktor Hugo Palander.

Philosopher Pentti Linkola was his grandson through his daughter.

Education and university career
Suolahti passed his matriculation examination in 1892 and received his Masters from the University of Helsinki in 1896. Suolahti became a Doctor of Philosophy in 1900. In 1901, he became a docent of German Philology at the University of Helsinki and in 1911, he became a professor of the same subject, a post he occupied for more than 40 years, until 1941. Suolahti specialized mainly in etymology and his work on words and vocabulary had a significant impact on Finnish research pertaining to German Philology. 

Suolahti was also an important administrator at the university. First, he served as vice-rector of the University of Helsinki from 1917 to 1923, and then as rector from 1923 to 1926 and finally as chancellor from 1926 to 1944.

Political career
He was a member of the National Coalition Party and was the first chairman of the party between 1918 and 1919. He was re-elected its leader in 1925, following the administration of Antti Tulenheimo.

References
Finnish parliamentary profile

1874 births
1944 deaths
People from Hämeenlinna
People from Häme Province (Grand Duchy of Finland)
National Coalition Party politicians
Members of the Parliament of Finland (1919–22)
University of Helsinki alumni
Academic staff of the University of Helsinki
Rectors of the University of Helsinki
Chancellors of the University of Helsinki